Polona Hercog was the defending champion, but chose to not compete this year.  Irina-Camelia Begu defeated Laura Pous Tió in the final 6–3, 77–61.

Seeds

Draw

Finals

Top half

Bottom half

References
 Main Draw
 Qualifying Draw

Copa Bionaire - Singles
Copa Bionaire